{{Infobox venue
| name                = Shah Alam StadiumStadium Shah Alam ستاديوم  شاه  عالم
| website             = 
| logo_image          = 
| image               = Shah_Alam_Stadium_aerial_view.jpg
| image_size          = 500px
| caption             = Stadium Shah Alam (1994 - 2022: Currently under rebuilding and remodeling)
| owner               = State Government of Selangor
| operator            = Darul Ehsan Facilities Management Sdn. Bhd.
| broke_ground        = 1 January 1990
| opened              = 16 July 1994
| renovated           = 2023 (rebuilding and remodeling) 
| location            = Shah Alam, Selangor, Malaysia
| coordinates         = 
| publictransit       =    
| surface             = cowgrass pitchTrack
| dimensions          = 
| architect           = Hijjaz Kasturi Associates Sdn. Bhd.  Malaysian Resources Corporation Berhad (rebuilding and remodeling)
| structural engineer = 
| services engineer   = 
| general_contractor  = 
| construction_cost   = RM480 million (1990)
RM787> million (2023)
| capacity            = 80,372
| suites              = 
| record_attendance   = 
| tenants             = Selangor (1994–2020)PKNS (2016–2019)
}}

The Shah Alam Stadium (Malay: Stadium Shah Alam) is a multi-purpose stadium located in Shah Alam, Selangor, Malaysia. It is used mostly for football matches but also has facilities for athletics. The stadium is the officially home of the Red Giants (Selangor) since 16 July 1994, and has a capacity of 80,372.

Despite multiple renovation attempts over the years, the stadium is currently in a state of disrepair resulting from long-term neglect in maintenance. In 2020, the Malaysian Football League (MFL) announced that the dilapidated stadium may be barred from hosting Malaysia Super League matches, due to safety reasons arising from the stadium's polycarbonate roof and pitch being in a poor state. On 15 July 2022, the Menteri Besar of Selangor, Amirudin Shari, stated said the Selangor government has appointed Malaysian Resources Corporation Berhad (MRCB) to that refurbish the stadium and its surrounding sporting facilities may cost up to RM787 million, will be started in early 2023.

 History 
Shah Alam Stadium is the officially home stadium for Selangor football club currently play in Malaysia's top division – the Super League. The field size for the stadium was according to FIFA rules which is 105 x 68m.

This stadium is inspired by Hajduk Split stadium, Poljud in Split, Croatia (built in 1979). Construction began on 1 January 1990, and the stadium was officially opened on 16 July 1994, when Dundee United played a Selangor selection in the first game of an invitational tournament, drawing 1–1. The first goal at the stadium was scored by Billy McKinlay.  Other teams in the tournament were Bayern Munich, Leeds United, the Australian Olympic team "Olyroos", and Flamengo (who won the tournament).

The stadium is situated in the eastern part of Shah Alam. The Shah Alam Stadium, which consists of huge six level semi-enclosed spaces, is the largest stadium in Selangor State. It was the biggest stadium in Malaysia before the completion of the National Stadium in Bukit Jalil. The frame structure is the longest free-standing arc in the world. Constructed with the latest technology, it is now a popular venue for world class sport events. The stadium was designed by a well known Malaysian Architect, Hijjaz Kasturi.

Bon Jovi made its debut Malaysian concert in the stadium on 4 May 1995.

The stadium has around 5,500 car bays in parking lots surrounding the stadium. The stadium has become the major landmark in Shah Alam due to its scale and magnificent architecture. Other than sporting facilities, the stadium also has a go-kart racing circuit. Once, Universiti Teknologi MARA's (UiTM) Faculty of Performing Arts occupied a portion of the stadium as its faculty building prior to the completion of the Puncak Perdana satellite campus of the university.

In 2011, RM 3.4 million was spent to renovate the stadium to upgrade the lighting system, roof repairs, new grass for the pitch as well as to replace vandalised seats, improving the sound system, upgrading the dressing rooms, repainting some parts of the stadium, repairing the washrooms as well as other facilities.

In 2014, RM 2.4mil was spent for the second phase of upgrading works, which includes replacing more than 500 roof tiles, replacing grass on the damaged parts of the field with the seashore paspalum variety, upgrading the changing rooms and toilets, repairing the public address system and two generator sets.
The cost was borne by the Selangor government.

Since December 2015, on several occasions Shah Alam Stadium has been closed for maintenance work.

The Shah Alam Stadium again went under renovation in 2016 which was completed and fully operational for the Malaysia Super League (MSL) match between Selangor and Kedah on 5 April.

The process of replacing the field with ‘cow grass’ including replacing the soil below the grass, which costs about RM200,000, was completed on 19 March.

The lighting system was also upgraded
from 1,200 lux to 2,000 lux.

In early 2020, the home of the Red Giants Selangor, Shah Alam Stadium, was closed for major renovation and rebuild work, which is planned to be ready in 2022.

 The Amazing Race Asia 
Shah Alam Stadium was featured in a challenge in the first leg of The Amazing Race Asia 1 where teams had to ride go-karts around the circuit.

 Matches 
 Exhibition match 
On 29 July 2008, an exhibition match was played between the Malaysia Select team and Chelsea. The match ended in a 2–0 win for the English side, courtesy of goals from Nicolas Anelka and Ashley Cole. Fellow Premier League club Arsenal took on a Malaysia XI team on 13 July 2011, as part of the club's Asia Tour.

 2014 AFF Championship 

The semi-final match between Malaysia and Vietnam was held here on the first leg tie. The score ended 1–2 to away team. Safiq Rahim scores a brace from a penalty spot.

Malaysia Cup matches
1994 Malaysia Cup Final

The first Malaysia Cup Final held at the Shah Alam Stadium was on December 17, 1994 (68th edition) when Singapore FA defeated Pahang FA 4–0. Goals from Abbas Saad (Hat-trick) and Fandi Ahmad became the fourth team to claim the double, FAM Dunhill Liga Perdana and FAM Dunhill Piala Malaysia after Johor FA in 1991, Pahang FA in 1992, and Kedah FA in 1993. Fandi Ahmad lifted the trophy in front of more than 50,000 Singaporean fans that traveled to the stadium. It was Singapore's FA 24th Malaysia Cup title since their last triumph in 1980.

The 2011-2013 and 2015-2018 editions of the Malaysia Cup were held at Shah Alam Stadium.

In the 2015 Malaysia Cup, it was considered as a home advantage for Shah Alam Stadium tenants, Selangor FA. The match was also considered as a déjà vu'' of the 2015 Malaysia Cup. Again in 2018 Malaysia Cup final between Perak vs Terengganu has been held in this stadium. This game was a dramatic final inducing two red cards for both teams, fighting, and two last-minute goals for Perak. Draw 3-3 after extra time and won by penalty shootout 4-1 for Perak TBG.

Recent tournament results

1997 FIFA World Youth Championship

2001 Southeast Asian Games

2007 AFC U-16 Women's Championship

2007 AFC Asian Cup

2017 Southeast Asian Games

See also 

 Sport in Malaysia
 List of Southeast Asia stadiums by capacity

References

External links 
 World Football Stadiums page

Football venues in Malaysia
AFC Asian Cup stadiums
Athletics (track and field) venues in Malaysia
Shah Alam
Multi-purpose stadiums in Malaysia
Sports venues in Selangor
Selangor FA
Sports venues completed in 1994
1994 establishments in Malaysia